San José Poaquil is a town and municipality in the Chimaltenango department of Guatemala. San José Poaquil, like many other Mayan indigenous towns throughout the western highlands, suffered greatly under the severe military repression of the early 1980s. In 2002, 76 human remains were exhumed from mass graves by the Forensic Anthropology Foundation of Guatemala (FAFG). According to locals, the 76 bodies that FAFG recovered represent a minimal portion of the municipality's residents that were killed or disappeared in the violence. Like other parts in Guatemala, reconciliation in Poaquil is complicated by the fact that the perpetrators of the violence, many of whom were forcibly conscripted into the military's Civil Defense Patrols (PAC), still live amongst their victims.

References 

Municipalities of the Chimaltenango Department